Mandal is a village in the Garhwal Himalayas of Uttarakhand, India.

About Mandal
According to Census 2011 information the location code or village code of Mandal village is 040908. Mandal village is located in Chamoli Tehsil of Chamoli district in Uttarakhand, India. It is situated 23 km away from sub-district headquarter Chamoli and 13 km away from district headquarter Gopeshwar. Mandal village is also a gram panchayat.

Demography
The total geographical area of village is 119.42 hectares. Mandal has a total population of 452 peoples. There are about 108 houses in village. As per 2019 stats, Mandal villages comes under Badrinath assembly & Garhwal parliamentary constituency. Gopeshwar is nearest town to Mandal which is approximately 13 km away.

See also
Gopeshwar
Chamoli
Tunganath

References

External links
https://www.euttaranchal.com/tourism/how-to-reach-mandal-village.php
https://indianexpress.com/article/lifestyle/destination-of-the-week/uttarakhand-travelogue-rudraprayag-mandal-chopta/lite/&ved=2ahUKEwi_hZq7kL3sAhUSA3IKHfGpCGkQFjAGegQIBhAB&usg=AOvVaw0dyylDyVldyWeGEyW1rfUd&ampcf=1&cshid=1602990905583

Tourism in Uttarakhand
Villages in Chamoli district